Katherine Tucker (or variants) may refer to:

Kathryn Tucker, executive director for the Disability Rights Legal Center
Kathryn Tucker (producer), American film producer and entrepreneur
Catherine Tucker, American economist
Katherine Tucker, character in Blue Bloods (season 6)

See also
Kate Tucker, musician